O Human Star is a science fiction webcomic by Blue Delliquanti.

Synopsis 
O Human Star follows Alastair "Al" Sterling, the person who invented the modern robot. Sixteen years after Al dies, his mind is put into a synthetic replica of his human body. The world now is populated with robots living alongside humans. Al finds his old business partner and lover, Brendan, who has built their company into the world's largest tech company, and meets Sulla, the first humanoid robot, who was made with a copy of Al's mind but has chosen a female body. Al tries to reintegrate into the new world and determine who brought him back and why.

The comic is presented with sections both in the present and the past; the past is illustrated in orange, while the present is in blue.

Author and publication history 
O Human Star is written and illustrated by Blue Delliquanti. Delliquanti, who is non-binary and is from Minneapolis, previously worked with Soleil Ho on the graphic novel Meal for Iron Circus Comics, and has contributed to Smut Peddler, The Sleep of Reason, and Beyond.

O Human Star began publication in 2012 and concluded in August 2020.

Reviews 
Polygon reviewer Samantha Riedel called O Human Star "the best robot comic in a decade", saying that it "delves into complex themes of gender and the need to belong" and calling it "one of the most sociopolitically relevant works of the past ten years".

Writing for the DiNKY Awards, DiNKY director Ted Intorcio said "In addition to being a wonderful love story for these men, it challenges the reader’s perceptions of what “normal” looks like... OHS explores LGBTQ issues in a very sensitive way without having this context / subtext overpower the story... Blue's Manga-influenced style is more than competent and complements the tone of the story nicely. I can't recommend this book enough for anyone who likes great stories with rich context and tons of applicability."

Awards 

|-
! scope="row" | 2018
| Webcomics Category
| Prism Awards
| 
| For excerpts of O Human Star from 2017
| 
|-
! scope="row" | 2016
| Best in Show
| DiNKY Awards
| 
| 
| 
|-
! scope="row" | 2016
| Best Work - Self Published
| DiNKY Awards
| 
| 
| 
|-
! scope="row" | 2016
| Outstanding Work – Diversity
| DiNKY Awards
| 
| 
| 
|-
! scope="row" | 2015
| Outstanding Online Comic
| Ignatz Award
| 
| 
| 
|-
! scope="row" | 2015
| LGBT Graphic Novel
| Lambda Literary Award
| 
| 
| 
|-
! scope="row" | 2014
| Favorite Webcomic (Continuing Story)
| Autostraddle
| 
| 
| 
|-
! scope="row" | 2012
| Queer Press Grant
| Prism Comics
| 
| 
|

External links

References 

Science fiction webcomics
2010s webcomics
LGBT-related webcomics
LGBT speculative fiction
Transgender-related comics
LGBT-related graphic novels
Robots in literature